White Stones (released 15 April 1997 by Mercury Records – 534 605-2 (PolyGram / Philips Records) is the second album by Secret Garden.

Track listing

Personnel 
Violin – Fionnuala Sherry
Keyboards, Piano & Conductor of the Irish National Chamber Choir – Rolf Løvland
Guitar – Des Moore
Keyboards – Bjørn Ole Rasch
Bass – Eoghan O'Neill
Drums – Robbie Casserly
Orchestral percussion – Joakim Nordin
Choir – Irish National Chamber Choir
Orchestra – RTÉ Concert Orchestra
Conductor (RTÉ Concert Orchestra) – Fiachra Trench
Orchestra Leader – Michael D'Arcy

Credits 
Additional assistant recording engineers – Alessandro Benedetti, Jan Erik Kongshaug, Nick Friend & Ronny Talsaete
Assistant recording engineers & mixing – Conan Doyle & Jonathan Ford
Pre-production Co-engineer & sound samples – Alf Emil Eik
Mastering – Greg Calbi
Composer, arranger & producer – Rolf Løvland
Photography – Dorothy Low
Recorded By, Mixed By, Co-producer – Andrew Boland
Orchestral score – Fiachra Trench (tracks: 4-5 & 10), John Tate (tracks: 1-2, 6, 8-9, 11-12 & 14), Rolf Løvland (tracks: 3 & 7)

Notes 
Recorded and mixed in Windmill Lane Studios, Dublin Ireland. 
Additional recording made in Capri Digital Studio, Italy and Rainbow Studio, Oslo Norway. 
Pre-production and additional recording made in Cross Studio, Kristiansand Norway. 
Masterted at Masterdisk, New York City, U.S.A.
White Stones is dedicated to the memory of our fathers Ben Sherry and Sigurd Lovland.
Mercury Records is a PolyGram company
℗ & © 1995 PolyGram A/S Norway

References

1997 albums
Secret Garden (duo) albums